The 2018–19 Central Michigan Chippewas women's basketball team represented Central Michigan University during the 2018–19 NCAA Division I women's basketball season. The Chippewas, led by twelfth-year head coach Sue Guevara, played their home games at McGuirk Arena as members of the West Division of the Mid-American Conference. They finished the season 25–8, 15–3 in MAC play to win the MAC West Division. The Chippewas advanced to the semifinals of the MAC women's tournament, losing there to Buffalo. They received an at-large bid to the NCAA women's tournament, losing to their in-state rival Michigan State in the first round.

This proved to be the final season for Guevara as head coach, as she retired during the 2019 offseason. At the same time that CMU announced her retirement, it announced that Guevara's top assistant Heather Oesterle would succeed her as head coach.

Roster

Schedule

|-
!colspan=9 style=| Exhibition

|-
!colspan=9 style=| Non-conference regular season

|-
!colspan=9 style=| MAC regular season

|-
!colspan=9 style=| MAC Women's Tournament

|-
!colspan=9 style=|NCAA Women's Tournament

Rankings
2018–19 NCAA Division I women's basketball rankings

^Coaches did not release a Week 2 poll.

See also
 2018–19 Central Michigan Chippewas men's basketball team

References

Central Michigan
Central Michigan Chippewas women's basketball seasons
Central Michigan
Central Michigan
Central Michigan